Madison Township is one of the five townships of Lake County, Ohio, United States. As of the 2010 census the population was 18,889. It is the largest township in Ohio by area.

Geography
Located in the easternmost part of the county along Lake Erie, it borders the following townships:
Geneva Township, Ashtabula County - northeast
Harpersfield Township, Ashtabula County - east
Trumbull Township, Ashtabula County - southeast corner
Thompson Township, Geauga County - south
LeRoy Township - southwest
Perry Township - west

Several populated places are located in Madison Township:
The village of Madison, in the center
A small portion of the village of North Perry, in the far northwest
The census-designated place of North Madison, along the lakeshore
Part of the unincorporated community of Unionville, on the border with Harpersfield Township

The township extends north into the center of Lake Erie, where it ends at the Canadian border.

Name
The township was probably named for James Madison or after Madison, Connecticut. It is one of twenty Madison Townships statewide.

Government
The township is governed by a three-member board of trustees, who are elected in November of odd-numbered years to a four-year term beginning on the following January 1. Two are elected in the year after the presidential election and one is elected in the year before it. There is also an elected township fiscal officer, who serves a four-year term beginning on April 1 of the year after the election, which is held in November of the year before the presidential election. Vacancies in the fiscal officership or on the board of trustees are filled by the remaining trustees.  Currently, the board is composed of Chairman Max Andersen, Jr., and members Peter V. Wayman and Kenneth R. Gauntner, and Terry Gerred-Ditchcreek is the Fiscal Officer

Education
Students enrolled in kindergarten through the fifth grade attend Madison Elementary North or Madison Elementary South and students in grades sixth through eight attend Madison Middle School. Local high school students attend Madison High School. Madison Township is also home to one of Lakeland Community College's three off-site centers.

References

External links

Lake County website

Townships in Lake County, Ohio
Urban townships in Ohio
Townships in Ohio